Bicknell is a city in Knox County, Indiana, United States. The population was 2,915 at the 2010 census.

History
Bicknell was laid out in 1869 by John Bicknell, and named for him.

Geography
Bicknell is located at  (38.773512, −87.307967). It is located in northeastern Knox County.

Climate
The climate in this area is characterized by hot, humid summers and generally mild to cool winters.  According to the Köppen Climate Classification system, Bicknell has a humid subtropical climate, abbreviated "Cfa" on climate maps.

Demographics

2010 census
As of the 2010 census, there were 2,915 people, 1,187 households, and 737 families living in the city. The racial makeup of the city was 97.6% White, 0.5% African American, 0.2% Native American, 0.2% Asian, 0.4% from other races, and 1.0% from two or more races. Hispanic or Latino of any race were 1.9% of the population.

There were 1,187 households, of which 31.1% had children under the age of 18 living with them, 44.5% were married couples living together, 12.6% had a female householder with no husband present, 5.1% had a male householder with no wife present, and 37.9% were non-families. 31.9% of all households were made up of individuals, and 14.5% had someone living alone who was 65 years of age or older. The average household size was 2.45 and the average family size was 3.10.

The median age in the city was 38.7 years. 25.1% of residents were under the age of 18; 9.3% were between the ages of 18 and 24; 23% were from 25 to 44; 26.3% were from 45 to 64; and 16.4% were 65 years of age or older. The gender makeup of the city was 48.7% male and 51.3% female.

2000 census
As of the 2000 census, there were 3,378 people, 2,156 households, and 1,913 families living in the city. The racial makeup of the city was 98.13% White, 0.4% African American, 0.2% Native American, 0.15% Asian, 0.12% Pacific Islander, 0.06% from other races, and 0.89% from two or more races. Hispanic or Latino of any race were 0.25% of the population.

There were 1,395 households, out of which 29.9% had children under the age of 18 living with them, 49.2% were married couples living together, 12.6% had a female householder with no husband present, and 34.7% were non-families. 30.5% of all households were made up of individuals, and 16.2% had someone living alone who was 65 years of age or older. The average household size was 2.38 and the average family size was 2.95.

In the city, the population was spread out, with 25.3% under the age of 18, 8.7% from 18 to 24, 25.5% from 25 to 44, 23.1% from 45 to 64, and 17.4% who were 65 years of age or older. The median age was 38 years. For every 100 females, there were 89.9 males. For every 100 females age 18 and over, there were 84.5 males.

The median income for a household in the city was $23,046, and the median income for a family was $32,935. Males had a median income of $31,487 versus $58,162 for females. The per capita income for the city was $13,027. About 18.5% of families and 26.3% of the population were below the poverty line, including 38.4% of those under age 18 and 21.0% of those age 65 or over. The median age was 38.7

Government 
Bicknell has a mayor-council system of government; both the mayor and city council serve four-year terms. There are five councilmen on the council, with four from districts and one at-large member.

Education
Bicknell has a public library, a branch of the Bicknell-Vigo Township Public Library.

Notable people
Norman Arterburn, Justice of the Indiana Supreme Court
Joseph Barr, former Congressman and Secretary of the Treasury during the Johnson administration
Tricia Cullop, current head coach of the Toledo Rockets women's basketball team
Herdis McCrary, fullback for 1929 NFL Champion Green Bay Packers
John McNaughton, Secretary of the Navy designate, Johnson administration
Jones Osborn, Arizona newspaper editor and state legislator

References

Cities in Indiana
Cities in Knox County, Indiana
Communities of Southwestern Indiana